Jacky Terrasson is a self-titled studio album by French-American jazz pianist Jacky Terrasson released in 1994 by Blue Note label. This is his first full-size album as a leader. The release is a collection of jazz standards with four compositions written by Terrasson.

Reception
Scott Yanow of AllMusic wrote, "Jacky Terrasson delights in turning standards inside out. It is fortunate that bassist Ugonna Okegwo and drummer Leon Parker are very alert (or perhaps well-rehearsed), because to the uninitiated listener these eccentric and rather quirky performances are often quite unpredictable and occasionally jarring. Well worth checking out." Entertainment Weekly review by David Hajdu commented, "Jacky Terrasson is a fiery display of untraditional ideas and virtuoso daring. Terrasson overcomes the no-win scenario of the standard repertoire by changing the rules." Don Heckman of Los Angeles Times added, "The act of performing a set of standards on a debut album is, at the very least, courageous and runs the risk of endless comparisons... A powerful maiden voyage for a performer who is going to be one of the important jazz voices of the ‘90s."

Track listing

Personnel
Jacky Terrasson – piano
Ugonna Okegwo – bass
Leon Parker – drums

References

1994 albums
Jacky Terrasson albums
Blue Note Records albums